The predicted antwren (Herpsilochmus praedictus) is an insectivorous bird in the antbird family Thamnophilidae. 

The predicted antwren was first described in 2013. The name refers to the fact that the bird was predicted to be a separate species on the basis of its distinctive vocalizations, which was later confirmed by analysis of its mitochondrial DNA.

It is found in Amazonian Brazil.

See also
 List of bird species discovered since 1900

References

 

Herpsilochmus
Birds of the Amazon Basin
Birds described in 2013
Endemic birds of Brazil